The 2016 Tianjin Health Industry Park was a professional tennis tournament played on outdoor hard courts. It was the third edition of the tournament and part of the 2016 ITF Women's Circuit, offering a total of $50,000 in prize money. It took place in Tianjin, China, on 23–29 May 2016.

Singles main draw entrants

Seeds 

 1 Rankings as of 16 May 2016.

Other entrants 
The following player received a wildcard into the singles main draw:
  Lu Jiaxi

The following players received entry from the qualifying draw:
  Chen Jiahui
  Jiang Xinyu
  Tang Haochen
  Zhang Ying

Champions

Singles

 Aryna Sabalenka def.  Nina Stojanović, 5–7, 6–3, 6–1

Doubles

 Li Yihong /  Wang Yan def.  Liu Wanting /  Lu Jingjing, 1–6, 6–0, [10–4]

External links 
 2016 Tianjin Health Industry Park at ITFtennis.com

2016 ITF Women's Circuit
2016 in Chinese tennis
Tianjin Health Industry Park